Lophomyrtus obcordata, also known as rōhutu or tutuhi, is a species of evergreen myrtle shrub in the genus Lophomyrtus, family Myrtaceae. It is found throughout New Zealand, usually in lowland forest and forest edges.

Lophomyrtus obcordata has white flowers in summer.

Lophomyrtus obcordata will easily hybridise with L. bullata (ramarama), the only other species in the genus. This has given rise to a number of cultivars with interesting foliage variations that are sold commercially.

Propagation is usually by semi-hardwood cutting, or by seed.

The wood is red coloured, very dense and hard, and has been used for small dimension inlay work.

References

Flora of New Zealand
Myrtaceae